To the Ladies is an album by saxophonist Johnny Griffin which was recorded in 1979 and released on the Galaxy label.

Reception

The AllMusic review by Scott Yanow stated: "tenor saxophonist Johnny Griffin sticks exclusively to group originals on this interesting but not essential LP. Griffin is in excellent form, as usual, but none of the tunes caught on".

Track listing
All compositions by Johnny Griffin, except where indicated.
 "Miriam" – 4:45
 "Susanita" (Ray Drummond) – 7:46
 "Jean Marie" (Ronnie Mathews) – 8:07
 "Soft and Furry, Part 1" – 6:51
 "Soft and Furry, Part 2" – 4:54
 "Soft and Furry, Part 3" – 3:57
 "Honey Bucket" – 7:00

Personnel
Johnny Griffin – tenor saxophone
Ronnie Mathews – piano
Ray Drummond – bass
Idris Muhammad – drums

References

Galaxy Records albums
Johnny Griffin albums
1982 albums
Albums produced by Orrin Keepnews